Mochican may refer to:
 Mohicans, an Eastern Algonquian Native American tribe
 Moche culture, a native culture of Peru
 Mochica language, a native language of Peru

See also 
 Mohican (disambiguation)
 Mohegan people, a Native American tribe based in Southeastern Connecticut